Buenos Aires International Airport may refer to:

Aeroparque Jorge Newbery, the main airport hub for domestic flights in Buenos Aires, Argentina
Ministro Pistarini International Airport, an international airport serving Buenos Aires, Argentina